Harry C. Cashman (June 20, 1869 – December 14, 1912) was an American stage and silent film actor. He was born in Ohio and died in Chicago, Illinois. He worked primarily for the Essanay Company of Chicago. He often costarred with Francis X. Bushman in Bushman's first couple of years in films. Cashman died of pneumonia.

Selected filmography
Taming a Tyrant (1911)*short
What Happened to Aunty (1911)*short
The Laundry Lady's Luck (1911)*short
She Got the Money (1911)*short
Her Dad the Constable (1911)*short
The Dark Romance of a Tobacco Tin (1911)*short
The Burglarized Burglar (1911)*short
Bill Bumper's Bargain (1911)*short
He Fought for the U.S.A. (1911)*shortThe Madman (1911)*shortThe Long Strike (1911)*shortThe Goodfellow's Christmas Eve (1911)*shortThe Valley of Regrets'' (1912)*short

References

External links
Harry C. Cashman at IMDb.com
Harry Cashman portraits (Univ. of Washington,Sayre)

1869 births
1912 deaths
American male stage actors
American male film actors
American male silent film actors
Male actors from Cincinnati
Male actors from Ohio
19th-century American male actors
20th-century American male actors
Burials at Graceland Cemetery (Chicago)
Deaths from pneumonia in Illinois